Stefanko (Russian or Ukrainian: Стефанко) is a gender-neutral Slavic surname. Notable people with the surname include:

 Frank Stefanko (born 1946), American photographer
 Olesya Stefanko (born 1988), Ukrainian lawyer and beauty queen 

Slavic-language surnames